Nehoiaşu Hydro Power Plant is a large power plant on the Bâsca Mare River or simply Bâsca River situated in Romania. The project was started in 1998 and it was made up by the construction of a dam with 8 mobile segments each 12 m high, which will be equipped with two vertical turbines, the hydropower plant having an installed capacity of 152 MW. The power plant will generate 328 GWh of electricity per year.

See also

Porţile de Fier I
Porţile de Fier II

External links
Description 

Hydroelectric power stations in Romania
Dams in Romania
Proposed hydroelectric power stations
Proposed renewable energy power stations in Romania